Smarts Mountain is a  mountain in the town of Lyme in Grafton County, New Hampshire, United States. Although of only moderate elevation, Smarts is separated from the southwestern White Mountains by Oliverian Notch, a fairly low pass traversed by New Hampshire Route 25 southwest of Mount Moosilauke.

The northwest and south sides of the mountain drain by several brooks into the Connecticut River and thence south into Long Island Sound in Connecticut. The northeast side drains east into the South Branch of the Baker River, and thence via the Pemigewasset and Merrimack rivers into the Gulf of Maine in Massachusetts.

Smarts Mountain is the southernmost significant mountain in New Hampshire on the Appalachian Trail, a  National Scenic Trail from Georgia to Maine. Smarts is outside the White Mountain National Forest, but the trail runs through a narrow corridor along the ridges which is administered by the Forest Service.

There was a Learjet plane crash on the mountain in 1996, as well as a Piper Apache twin crash in 1971.

References

External links
 
  PeakBagger.com: Smarts

Smarts
Smarts
Mountains on the Appalachian Trail